The Hunua Falls are on the  Wairoa River in the Auckland Region of New Zealand, near Hunua. The land around was bought by Auckland for water supplies between 1940 and 1960. The mean flow of water downstream at Clevedon is /s, but can vary greatly, as illustrated in photographs showing the falls in winter and summer.

Natural features

The Wairoa River falls over a basalt lava plug. Volcanic tuff rings and lava bombs are visible in the east wall of the waterfall.

Several herbs have been identified near the falls - water starwort (Callitriche petriei), Crassula hunua, water pennywort (Hydrocotyle microphylla), wood-sorrel (Oxalis magellanica).

The Wairoa has smaller falls. A photograph appeared in 1901.

Access and recreational activities 
As well as tracks to the Hunua Ranges, there are two 30 minute walks; The Lookout Walk and the Upper Lookout Walk. The cliffs are used for abseiling.

References

External links

 1:50,000 map
 Auckland Weekly News photo 1904

Waterfalls of New Zealand
Landforms of the Auckland Region
Parks in the Auckland Region